James Aldrich (1810–1856) was an editor and minor poet.

Aldrich was born in Mattituck, New York, apparently 14 July 1810, and was married in 1836. He was a merchant and editor. He founded the short-lived New York Literary Gazette in 1839, and later in 1842–44 worked as an editor on the New World (New York). Much of his poetry was published in his Literary Gazette, and not brought together in a collection until after his death, when his daughter circulated it privately. His poem A Death-Bed is often republished.

He died 9 September 1856.

References

External links

 
 

1810 births
1856 deaths
Poets from New York (state)
People from Mattituck, New York
19th-century American poets
American male poets
American newspaper editors
19th-century American male writers
American male non-fiction writers